O Kum-ran  (born 18 September 1981,) is a North Korean women's international footballer who plays as a midfielder. She is a member of the North Korea women's national football team. She was part of the team at the 2003 FIFA Women's World Cup.

International goals

References

1981 births
Living people
North Korean women's footballers
North Korea women's international footballers
Place of birth missing (living people)
2003 FIFA Women's World Cup players
Women's association football midfielders
Footballers at the 2002 Asian Games
Asian Games gold medalists for North Korea
Asian Games medalists in football
Medalists at the 2002 Asian Games